The 2017 FRD LMP3 Series (Chinese LMP3 Championship) was the inaugural season of the FRD LMP3 Series, the series supported by the ACO attracted some of the best teams in Asia & professional drivers from Europe, Australia and Asia making for a very competitive series. Craft-Bamboo Racing won the teams title after their driver James Winslow won the 2017 driver championship, after victory at Shanghai, Zhuhai, Zhejiang in the Disney-Pixar supported Lightning McQueen Ligier #95 JSP3.

Calendar

Entry List

LMP3

Teams and drivers
Alex Tagliani will join Australia's Greg Taylor in Craft-Bamboo Racing's Ligier JS P3 LMP3.

References

External links
 
 

2017 in Chinese motorsport